The 1993–94 Eredivisie season was the 34th season of the Eredivisie, the top level of ice hockey in the Netherlands. 10 teams participated in the league, and the Tilburg Trappers won the championship.

Regular season

Final round

Playoffs

Relegation

External links 
 Season on hockeyarchives.info

Neth
Eredivisie (ice hockey) seasons
Ere 
Ere